(English: Inspector Mask) was a Croatian and Yugoslav animated comedy television series produced for television by Zagreb Film that ran from 1962 to 1963.

Development
The idea for the series originated from the 1959 animated short Inspektor se vratio kući, directed by Vatroslav Mimica, which was particularly well received.

Synopsis
The story takes place in an unnamed American metropolis of the 1960s, where a criminal gang led by Prehlađeni Joe (Runny Nose Joe) carries out various criminal acts, but is thwarted by police inspektor Maska, using various disguises to track them and catch them in the end.

Episode list
Source:

References

External links

Inspektor Maska - EP3 on YouTube

Yugoslav culture
1962 Yugoslav television series debuts
1963 Yugoslav television series endings
Croatian animated television series
1960s Yugoslav television series
1960s animated television series
Zagreb Film films
Fictional Yugoslav people
Fictional Croatian people